Nuclear Instruments and Methods in Physics Research (Nucl. Instrum. Methods Phys. Res.) is a peer-reviewed scientific journal published by Elsevier. It was established in 1957 as Nuclear Instruments. It focuses on detectors descriptions and data analysis methods.

History
Nuclear Instruments (1957–1958)
Nuclear Instruments and Methods (1959–1981)
Nuclear Instruments and Methods in Physics Research (1981–present)
Nuclear Instruments and Methods in Physics Research Section A: Accelerators, Spectrometers, Detectors and Associated Equipment (1984–present)
Nuclear Instruments and Methods in Physics Research Section B: Beam Interactions with Materials and Atoms (1984–present)

External links
Nuclear Instruments
Nuclear Instruments and Methods
Nuclear Instruments and Methods in Physics Research
Nuclear Instruments and Methods in Physics Research Section A: Accelerators, Spectrometers, Detectors and Associated Equipment
Nuclear Instruments and Methods in Physics Research Section B: Beam Interactions with Materials and Atoms

Elsevier academic journals
Publications established in 1957
English-language journals
Nuclear physics journals
Research methods journals